Carlotta Tagnin (born 28 January 1965) is an Italian former breaststroke swimmer who competed in the 1984 Summer Olympics.

References

1965 births
Living people
Italian female breaststroke swimmers
Olympic swimmers of Italy
Swimmers at the 1984 Summer Olympics
Mediterranean Games gold medalists for Italy
Mediterranean Games medalists in swimming
Swimmers at the 1979 Mediterranean Games
20th-century Italian women